Jan Wojciech Bachleda-Curuś (19 April 1951 in Zakopane – 7 February 2009 in Zakopane) was a Polish alpine skier who competed in the 1976 Winter Olympics.

External links
 sports-reference.com

1951 births
2009 deaths
Polish male alpine skiers
Olympic alpine skiers of Poland
Alpine skiers at the 1976 Winter Olympics
Sportspeople from Zakopane
Universiade medalists in alpine skiing
Universiade silver medalists for Poland
Competitors at the 1978 Winter Universiade
20th-century Polish people

References